"Party for Two" is a song recorded by the Canadian singer Shania Twain. It was released as the lead single from her Greatest Hits compilation album. The song was written by Twain and her then-husband Robert John "Mutt" Lange. "Party for Two" was recorded as both a pop mix with Mark McGrath and a country mix with Billy Currington. The song was released to country, adult contemporary, and mainstream pop radio formats, as well as European and other international markets.

"Party for Two" was a commercial success for Twain: it was her third highest debut and sixteenth career top 10 on the Billboard country charts, and charted well in Europe. In addition to the original pop and country mixes, the song would be remixed for club play, becoming one of her most remixed singles. Commercial singles were released on October 25, 2004, in Germany, on November 2, 2004, in Canada, and on November 22, 2004, in the UK. In 2005, "Party for Two" was certified Gold by the RIAA for selling over 100,000 digital downloads, making it Twain's first single to be downloaded that many times. For the first time in her touring career, Twain performed "Party for Two" on her 2015 Rock This Country Tour. She has since performed the song on her Now Tour and Let's Go! residency.

Composition
"Party for Two" features two versions:  a pop version featuring Sugar Ray frontman Mark McGrath and a country version featuring Billy Currington.  Twain and her then-husband, Robert John "Mutt" Lange, wrote the song, with Lange handling production. According to the sheet music published at Musicnotes.com, "Party for Two" is written in the key of B major with a tempo of 122 beats per minute.  The chord progression contains open fifths:  E5–B5–F5, and the vocals span from E3 to G4.

Music video
An accompanying music video for "Party for Two" was shot in London, UK, in the South Kensington area on August 28 and 29, 2004, and features the Royal Albert Hall. It was directed by Marcus Raboy and was premiered on September 27, 2004. The video shows Twain walking around town handing out invitations to movers, a waiter (played by Sebastian J. Brook), and an artist, to help her get ready for her "party for two" later that night. At the party, Twain and her guest end up swinging on a chandelier and smashing plates. Two separate versions of the video exist - one with Mark McGrath and the other with Billy Currington.

The video proved to be successful, with the pop version winning the MuchMusic Video Award for the MuchMoreMusic Video of the Year while the country version was nominated for Collaborative Video of the Year at the 2005 CMT Music Awards. Neither video is available on DVD, but are available on some releases of the CD single.

Chart performance
"Party for Two" debuted on the Billboard Hot Country Singles & Tracks chart in the week of September 18, 2004, at number 39, Twain's third highest debut of all time, and highest of the week. The single spent 20 weeks on the chart and climbed to a peak position of number seven on December 25, 2004, where it remained for one week. "Party for Two" became Twain's 16th and final top ten single and 22nd (seventh consecutive) top 20 single. It also peaked at number 58 on the Billboard Hot 100 and 57 on the Hot 100 Airplay charts.

On adult contemporary radio, "Party for Two" debuted at number 36, the highest debut of the week, on November 20, 2004. The single spent 19 weeks on the chart and climbed to a peak position of number 16 on January 22, 2005, where it remained for two non-consecutive weeks. "Party for Two" became Twain's ninth consecutive top 20 single.

"Party for Two" proved to be successful internationally. In the UK it debuted at its peak position at number 10, making it her ninth top ten single. It first appeared on December 4, 2004, and remained on the charts for nine weeks. In Canada, "Party for Two" held the top position on the BDS airplay chart for six weeks, and reached number two on the sales chart, held off only by Kalan Porter's "Awake in a Dream". In all, "Party for Two" was in the top ten in six countries: Austria, Canada, Denmark, Germany, Portugal and the UK.

Track listings
These are the formats of major releases.

UK CD Maxi
"Party For Two" (Pop Version) - 3:32
"You're Still The One" (Live) - 3:28
"I'm Holding On To Love (To Save My Life)" (Live) - 3:24
"Party For Two" (Country Version) - 3:24
"Party For Two" (Almighty Downtown Radio Edit) - 3:37
Enhanced: "Party For Two" (Pop Version) - Music Video
Enhanced: "Party For Two" (Country Version) - Music Video

Germany & Canada CD Single
"Party For Two" (Pop Version with Intro) - 3:32
"You're Still The One" (Live) - 3:28
"I'm Holding On To Love (To Save My Life)" - 3:24
"Party For Two" (Country Version with Intro) - 3:29
Enhanced: "Party For Two" - Music Video

UK CD Single
"Party For Two" (Pop Version) - 3:34
"Party For Two" (LMC Remix) - 6:18

Europe CD Single
"Party For Two" (Pop Version with Intro) - 3:32
"Party For Two" (Country Version with Intro) - 3:29

Germany & Europe 3" CD Single
"Party For Two" (Pop Version) - 3:32
"Party For Two" (Country Version) - 3:29

Official versions
"Party for Two" has become one of Twain's most professionally remixed songs. Almighty Records, which previously remixed "Thank You Baby!", provided six different versions of the song.

Cover versions
The song was covered by the South African singer Ray Dylan on his album Goeie Ou Country vol 3.

Charts

Weekly charts

Year-end charts

Certifications

Release history

References

2004 singles
Shania Twain songs
Mark McGrath songs
Billy Currington songs
Music videos directed by Marcus Raboy
Songs written by Robert John "Mutt" Lange
Song recordings produced by Robert John "Mutt" Lange
Songs written by Shania Twain
Male–female vocal duets
Mercury Records singles
Mercury Nashville singles
2004 songs